Vladislav Vasilyuchek (born 28 March 1994) is a Belarusian professional football player currently playing for Slutsk.

Early life
Vasilyuchek was born in Lida.

References

External links
 
 
 Profile at Neman website

1994 births
Living people
People from Lida
Sportspeople from Grodno Region
Belarusian footballers
Association football goalkeepers
FC Neman Grodno players
FC Smorgon players
FC Granit Mikashevichi players
FC Gorodeya players
FC Lida players
FC Isloch Minsk Raion players
FC Slutsk players